A foil bearing, also known as a foil-air bearing, is a type of air bearing. A shaft is supported by a compliant, spring-loaded foil journal lining. Once the shaft is spinning fast enough, the working fluid (usually air) pushes the foil away from the shaft so that no contact occurs. The shaft and foil are separated by the air's high pressure, which is generated by the rotation that pulls gas into the bearing via viscosity effects. The high speed of the shaft with respect to the foil is required to initiate the air gap, and once this has been achieved, no wear occurs. Unlike aerostatic or hydrostatic bearings, foil bearings require no external pressurisation system for the working fluid, so the hydrodynamic bearing is self-starting.

Development

 

Foil bearings were first developed in the late 1950s by AiResearch Mfg. Co. of the Garrett Corporation using independent R&D funds to serve military and space applications. They were first tested for commercial use in United Airlines Boeing 727 and Boeing 737 cooling turbines in the early and mid-1960s. Garrett AiResearch air cycle machine foil bearings were first installed as original equipment in 1969 in the DC-10's environmental control systems. Garrett AiResearch foil bearings were installed on all US military aircraft to replace existing oil-lubricated rolling-contact bearings.  The ability to operate at cryogenic gas temperatures and at very high temperatures gave foil bearings many other potential applications.

Current-generation foil bearings with advanced coatings have greatly exceeded the limitations of earlier designs. Antiwear coatings exist that allow over 100,000 start/stop cycles for typical applications.

Applications
Turbomachinery is the most common application because foil bearings operate at high speed. 
Commercial applications in production include microturbines, fuel cell blowers, and air cycle machines.  The main advantage of foil bearings is the elimination of the oil systems required by traditional bearing designs. Other advantages are:
 Higher efficiency, due to a lower heat loss to friction; instead of fluid friction, the main source of heat is parasitic drag
 Increased reliability
 Higher speed capability
 Quieter operation
 Wider operating temperature range (40–2,500 K)
 High vibration and shock load capacity
 No scheduled maintenance
 No external support system
 Truly oil free where contamination is an issue
 Capable of operating above critical speed

Areas of current research are:
 Higher load capacity
 Improved damping 
 Improved coatings

The main disadvantages are:
 Lower capacity than roller or oil bearings
 Wear during start-up and stopping
 High speed required for operation

See also

References

External links
NASA Glenn Research Center "Creating a Turbomachinery Revolution"
NASA Tribology & Mechanical Components Branch
R&D Dynamics Corporation Foil bearing supported high speed turbomachinery
Turbomachinery and Energy System Laboratory at UTA
Mohawk Innovative Technology, Inc.
Tribology Group at Texas A&M
Korean Institute for Science and Technology KIST
Center for Rotating Machinery at LSU
Oil-Free Machinery, LLC

Bearings (mechanical)
Gas turbine technology